This list of film spoofs in Mad includes films spoofed (parodied) by the American comic magazine Mad. Usually, an issue of Mad features a spoof of at least one feature film or television program. The works selected by the staff of Mad are typically from cinema and television in the United States.

The authors parody the original titles with puns or other wordplay. Characters are caricatured, and lampooned with joke names.

These articles typically cover five pages or more, and are presented as a sequential storyline with caricatures and word balloons. The opening page or two-page splash usually consists of the cast of the show introducing themselves directly to the reader; in some parodies, the writers sometimes attempt to circumvent this convention by presenting the characters without such direct exposition. This approach was also used for Mads television parodies, and came to be identified with the magazine. The style was widely copied by other humor publications. In 1973, the promotional movie poster for Robert Altman's The Long Goodbye was designed in the introductory manner of a Mad parody, including the rectangular word balloons with self-referential dialogue; for verisimilitude, the poster was written and drawn by Mad regulars Frank Jacobs and Jack Davis.

Many parodies end with the abrupt deus ex machina appearance of outside characters or pop culture figures who are similar in nature to the film or TV series being parodied, or who comment satirically on the theme. For example, Dr. Phil arrives to counsel the Desperate Housewives, or the cast of Sex and the City show up as the new hookers on Deadwood.

The parodies frequently make comedic use of the fourth wall, breaking character, and meta-references. Within an ostensibly self-contained storyline, the characters may refer to the technical aspects of filmmaking, the publicity, hype, or box office surrounding their project, their own past roles, any clichés being used, and so on. In 2013, Film Comment wrote, "While film studies majors gasp over the deconstruction of genre in the works of David Lynch and the meta-movies of Charlie Kaufman, 'the usual gang of idiots' over at MAD have been deconstructing, meta-narrativing, and postmodernizing motion pictures since the very first movie parody (Hah! Noon!) appeared in 1954." (However, that was actually Mad'''s second movie parody; the first had been Ping Pong three issues earlier.)

Almost all of the parodies are of a single, particular film. However, Mad has occasionally done omnibus parodies of film series, such as the James Bond movies, the 1970s Planet of the Apes sequels, and the Twilight Saga movies. It has also combined multiple mini-parodies of unrelated films into a single article. Some actors and directors have said that they regarded ridicule by Mad as an indication of major success in their careers.

In recent years, the parodies and their creators have been available outside the pages of the regular magazine. The March/April 2013 issue of Film Comment (Film Society of the Lincoln Center) carried Grady Hendrix's historical survey of Mads film parodies, titled Cahiers du CinéMAD. In August 2016, four of Mads longtime contributors—editor/artist Sam Viviano, writers Dick DeBartolo and Desmond Devlin, and artist Tom Richmond—appeared at a public symposium in Nebraska to discuss their work in this particular medium.  Mad has also published thematic collections of their past spoofs, from Oscar-winning films to superhero movies to gangster films.

In September 2020, with Mad having been reduced to a primarily reprint format, Tom Richmond and Desmond Devlin announced that they were crowdfunding a book of newly created movie parodies called Claptrap. They launched the campaign with the completed two-page opening spread for Star Worse: Plagiarizing Skywalker, a spoof of the ninth film in the Star Wars saga. The book will include twelve full parodies of older popular or iconic films that Mad had for various reasons opted not to parody at the time.

 Film spoofs list 

1950s

1960s
{| class="wikitable sortable"
! Spoofed Title
! Actual Title
! Writer
! Artist
! Issue
! Date
! Index
! Ref
|-
| The Producer and I| The King and I (June 1956)(Genre: Romantic musical)
| Nick Meglin
| Mort Drucker
|60
|1961-01January 1961
|
| 
|-
| Mad Visits John Wayde on the set of "At the Alamo"| The Alamo (October 1960)(Genre: Historical epic war) 
| Larry Siegel
| Mort Drucker
|63
|1961-06June 1961
|
| 
|-
| The Guns of Minestrone| The Guns of Navarone (June 1961)(Genre: War film)
| Larry Siegel
| Mort Drucker
|68
|1962-01January 1962
|
| 
|-
| If "Mardy" Were Made in Hollywood Today| Marty (April 1955)(Genre: Romantic drama)
| Larry Siegel
| Mort Drucker
|78
|1963-04April 1963
|
| 
|-
| East Side Story| West Side Story (October 1961)(Genre: Romantic musical)
| Frank Jacobs
| Mort Drucker
|78
|1963-04April 1963
|
| 
|-
| Mutiny on the Bouncy| Mutiny on the Bounty (November 1962)(Genre: Epic historical drama)
| Larry Siegel
| Wally Wood
|80
|1963-07July 1963
|
| 
|-
| For the Birds| The Birds (March 1963)(Genre: Horror-thriller)
| Arnie KogenLou Silverstone
| Mort Drucker
|82
|1963-10October 1963
|
| 
|-
| Hood!| Hud (May 1963)(Genre: Western)
| Larry Siegel
| Mort Drucker
|83
|1963-12December 1963
|
| 
|-
| Flawrence of Arabia| Lawrence of Arabia (December 1962)(Genre: Epic historical drama) 
| Frank JacobsStan HartLarry Siegel
| Mort Drucker
|86
|1964-04April 1964
|
|
|-
| Charades| Charade (December 1963)(Genre: Romantic comedy/mystery)
| Larry Siegel
| Mort Drucker
|88
|1964-07July 1964
|
| 
|-
| The Carpetsweepers| The Carpetbaggers (April 1964)(Genre: Drama)
| Larry Siegel
| Mort Drucker
|92
|1965-01January 1965
|
| 
|-
| The Flying Ace| Mads tribute to fighter-pilot films
| Dick DeBartolo
| Mort Drucker
|93
|1965-03March 1965
|
| 
|-
| 007: The James Bomb Musical
| Mads tribute to James Bond films
| Frank Jacobs
| Mort Drucker
|94
|1965-07April 1965
|
| 
|-
| Son of Mighty Joe Kong
| Mad'''s tribute to great ape films
| Dick DeBartolo
| Mort Drucker
|94
|1965-07April 1965
|
| 
|-
| Crazy Fists| Mads tribute to past fight films
| Dick DeBartolo
| Mort Drucker
|96
|1965-07July 1965
|
| 
|-
| Cheyenne Awful| Cheyenne Autumn (October 1964)(Genre: Western)
| Larry Siegel
| Mort Drucker
|97
|1965-09September 1965
|
| 
|-
| Lord Jump| Lord Jim (February 1965)(Genre: Adventure)
| Larry Siegel
| Mort Drucker
|98
|1965-10October 1965
|
| 
|-
| Hack, Hack, Sweet Has-Been or What Ever Happened to Good Taste?| Hush... Hush, Sweet Charlotte (December 1964) (Genre: Psychological thriller)andWhat Ever Happened to Baby Jane? (October 1962) (Genre: Psychological thriller/Horror)
| Larry Siegel
| Mort Drucker
|100
|1966-01January 1966
|
| 
|-
| The Sinpiper| The Sandpiper (June 1965)(Genre: Drama)
| Larry Siegel
| Mort Drucker
|101
|1966-03March 1966
|
| 
|-
| Bubby Lake Missed by a Mile| Bunny Lake Is Missing (October 1965)(Genre: Psychological thriller)
| Stan Hart
| Mort Drucker
|102
|1966-04April 1966
|
| 
|-
| The Agony and the Agony| The Agony and the Ecstasy (October 1965)(Genre: Historical)
| Larry Siegel
| Mort Drucker
|103
|1966-06June 1966
|
| 
|-
| The Spy That Came in for the Gold| The Spy Who Came In from the Cold (December 1965)(Genre: Spy film)
| Arnie Kogen
| Mort Drucker
|105
|1966-09September 1966
|
| 
|-
| The Bunch| The Group (March 1966)(Genre: Feminist film)
| Arnie Kogen
| Mort Drucker
|106
|1966-10October 1966
|
| 
|-
| The Sound of Money| The Sound of Music (March 1965)(Genre: Musical drama)
| Stan Hart
| Mort Drucker
|108
|1967-01January 1967
|
| 
|-
| Who in Heck is Virginia Woolfe?| Who's Afraid of Virginia Woolf? (June 1966)(Genre: Black comedy-drama)
| Larry Siegel
| Mort Drucker
|109
|1967-03March 1967
|
| 
|-
| Fantastecch Voyage| Fantastic Voyage (August 1966)(Genre: Science fiction)
| Larry Siegel
| Mort Drucker
|110
|1967-04April 1967
|
| 
|-
| The Amateurs| The Professionals (November 1966)(Genre: Western)
| Larry Siegel
| Mort Drucker
|112
|1967-07July 1967
|
| 
|-
| Throw-Up| Blow-Up (December 1966)(Genre: Thriller-drama)
| Arnie Kogen
| Bruce Stark
|113
|1967-09September 1967
|
| 
|-
| Dr. Zhicago| Doctor Zhivago (December 1965)(Genre: Epic romantic drama)
| Dick DeBartolo
| Jack Davis
|113
|1967-09September 1967
|
| 
|-
| Is Paris Boring?| Is Paris Burning? (October 1966)(Genre: War film)
| Lou Silverstone
| Mort Drucker
|113
|1967-09September 1967
|
| 
|-
| Sombre| Hombre (March 1967)(Genre: Revisionist western) 
| Lou Silverstone
| Mort Drucker
|114
|1967-10October 1967
|
| 
|-
| Grim Pix| Grand Prix (December 1966)(Genre: Auto-racing/Drama)
| Dick DeBartolo
| Mort Drucker
|115
|1967-10December 1967
|
| 
|-
| Dirtier by the Dozen| The Dirty Dozen (June 1967)(Genre: War film)
| Lou Silverstone
| Mort Drucker
|116
|1968-01January 1968
|
| 
|-
| The "Sam Pebbles"| The Sand Pebbles (December 1966)(Genre: Period war)
| Stan Hart
| Mort Drucker
|117
|1968-03March 1968
|
| 
|-
| In the Out Exit| Up the Down Staircase (July 1967)(Genre: Drama)
| Stan Hart
| Mort Drucker
|118
|1968-04April 1968
|
| 
|-
| Balmy and Clod| Bonnie and Clyde (August 1967)(Genre: Biographical crime)
| Larry Siegel
| Mort Drucker
|119
|1968-06June 1968
|
| 
|-
| Blue-Eyed Kook| Cool Hand Luke (November 1967)(Genre: Prison drama)
| Stan Hart
| Mort Drucker
|120
|1968-07July 1968
|
| 
|-
| Valley of the Dollars| Valley of the Dolls (December 1967)(Genre: Drama)
| Larry Siegel
| Mort Drucker
|121
|1968-09September 1968
|
| 
|-
| The Post-Graduate| The Graduate (December 1967)(Genre: Romantic comedy-drama)
| Stan Hart
| Mort Drucker
|122
|1968-10October 1968
|
| 
|-
| Guess Who's Throwing Up Dinner?| Guess Who's Coming to Dinner (December 1967)(Genre: Comedy-drama)
| Stan Hart
| Mort Drucker
|122
|1968-10October 1968
|
| 
|-
| In Cold Blecch!| In Cold Blood (December 1967)(Genre: Docudrama)
| Stan Hart
| Mort Drucker
|122
|1968-10October 1968
|
| 
|-
| Can A Lot| Camelot (October 1967)(Genre: Musical comedy-drama)
| Frank Jacobs
| Mort Drucker
|123
|1968-12December 1968
|
| 
|-
| Rosemia's Boo-Boo| Rosemary's Baby (June 1968)(Genre: Psychological horror)
| Arnie Kogen
| Mort Drucker
|124
|1969-01January 1969
|
| 
|-
| 201 Minutes of a Space Idiocy| 2001: A Space Odyssey (April 1968)(Genre: Epic science-fiction)
| Dick DeBartolo
| Mort Drucker
|125
|1969-03March 1969
|
| 
|-
| Bullbit| Bullitt (October 1968)(Genre: Thriller)
| Al Jaffee
| Mort Drucker
|127
|1969-06June 1969
|
| 
|-
| The Guru of Ours| The Wizard of Oz (August 1939)(Genre: Musical fantasy)
| Frank Jacobs
| Mort Drucker
|128
|1969-07July 1969
|
| 
|-
| The Brother Hoods| The Brotherhood (December 1968)(Genre: Crime-drama)
| Lou Silverstone
| Mort Drucker
|129
|1969-09September 1969
|
| 
|-
| Where Vultures Fare| Where Eagles Dare (December 1968)(Genre: War film)
| Larry Siegel
| Angelo Torres
|130
|1969-10October 1969
|
| 
|-
| Hoo-Boy, Columbus!| Goodbye, Columbus (April 1969)(Genre: Romantic comedy-drama)
| Arnie Kogen
| Mort Drucker
|131
|1969-12December 1969
|
| 
|}

1970s

1980s
{| class="wikitable sortable"
! Spoofed Title
! Actual Title
! Writer
! Artist
! Issue
! Date
! Index
! Ref
|-
| Alias| Alien (May 1979)(Genre: Science fiction horror)
| Dick DeBartolo
| Mort Drucker
| 212
|1954-04 January 1980
|
| 
|-
| Moneyraker| Moonraker (June 1979)(Genre: Science fiction)
| Stan Hart
| Harry North, Esq.
| 213
|1954-04 March 1980
|
| 
|-
| Rockhead II| Rocky II (June 1979)(Genre: Sports drama)
| Larry Siegel
| Angelo Torres
| 213
|1954-04 March 1980
|
| 
|-
| The Calamityville Horror| The Amityville Horror (July 1979)(Genre: Supernatural horror)
| Dick DeBartolo
| Mort Drucker
| 214
|1954-04 April 1980
|
| 
|-
| The Corncorde – Airplot '79| The Concorde ... Airport '79 (August 1979)(Genre: Disaster film)
| Dick DeBartolo
| Mort Drucker
| 214
|1954-04 April 1980
|
| 
|-
| A Crock O' (Blip!) Now| Apocalypse Now (August 1979)(Genre: War film)
| Larry Siegel
| Mort Drucker
| 215
|1954-04 June 1980
|
| 
|-
| Star Blecch: The (GACCK!) Motion Picture| Star Trek: The Motion Picture (December 1979)(Genre: Science fiction)
| Dick DeBartolo
| Mort Drucker
| 216
|1954-04 July 1980
|
| 
|-
| Crymore vs. Crymore| Kramer vs. Kramer (December 1979)(Genre: Drama)
| Stan Hart
| Mort Drucker
| 217
|1954-04 September 1980
|
| 
|-
| Being Not All There| Being There (December 1979)(Genre: Comedy-drama)
| Larry Siegel
| Mort Drucker
| 218
|1954-04 October 1980
|
| 
|-
| Throw Up the Academy| Up the Academy (June 1980)(Genre: Teen comedy)
| Stan Hart
| Angelo Torres
| 218
|1954-04 October 1980
|
| 
|-
| Gold Mining Daughter| Coal Miner's Daughter (March 1980)(Genre: Biographical musical)
| Arnie Kogen
| Mort Drucker
| 219
|1954-04 December 1980
|
| 
|-
| Little "Star"lings| Little Darlings (March 1980)(Genre: Teen comedy-drama)
| Arnie Kogen
| Mort Drucker
| 219
|1954-04 December 1980
|
| 
|-
| The Empire Strikes Out| The Empire Strikes Back (May 1980)(Genre: Space opera)
| Dick DeBartolo
| Mort Drucker
| 220
|1954-04 January 1981
|
| 
|-
| The Shiner| The Shining (May 1980)(Genre: Psychological horror)
| Larry Siegel
| Angelo Torres
| 221
|1954-04 March 1981
|
| 
|-
| Undressed to Kill| Dressed to Kill (July 1980)(Genre: Crime thriller)
| Arnie Kogen
| Mort Drucker
| 222
|1954-04 April 1981
|
| 
|-
| Extraordinary People| Ordinary People (September 1980)(Genre: Drama)
| Stan Hart
| Angelo Torres
| 223
|1954-04 June 1981
|
| 
|-
| Raving Bully| Raging Bull (December 1980)(Genre: Sports drama)
| Larry Siegel
| Mort Drucker
| 224
|1954-04 July 1981
|
| 
|-
| Assaulted State| Altered States (December 1980)(Genre: Science fiction horror)
| Dick DeBartolo
| Angelo Torres
| 225
|1954-04 September 1981
|
| 
|-
| Flopeye| Popeye (December 1980)(Genre: Musical comedy)
| Stan Hart
| Mort Drucker
| 225
|1954-04 September 1981
|
| 
|-
| Superduperman II| Superman II (December 1980)(Genre: Superhero film)
| Frank Jacobs
| Mort Drucker
| 226
|1954-04 October 1981
|
| 
|-
| Outlandish| Outland (May 1981)(Genre: Science fiction thriller) 
| Dick DeBartolo
| Angelo Torres
| 228
|1954-04 January 1982
|
| 
|-
| Raiders of a Lost Art| Raiders of the Lost Ark (June 1981)(Genre: Fantasy adventure)
| Dick DeBartoloFrank Jacobs
| Jack Davis
| 228
|1954-04 January 1982
|
| 
|-
| For Her Thighs Only| For Your Eyes Only (June 1981)(Genre: Spy film)
| Arnie Kogen
| Mort Drucker
| 229
|1954-04 March 1982
|
| 
|-
| Deathcrap| Deathtrap (March 1982)(Genre: Comedy thriller)
| Dick DeBartolo
| Mort Drucker
| 234
|1954-04 October 1982
|
| 
|-
| Death Which-Is-Which II| Death Wish II (February 1982)(Genre: Crime thriller)
| Dick DeBartolo
| Mort Drucker
| 234
|1954-04 October 1982
|
| 
|-
| On Olden Pond| On Golden Pond (December 1981)(Genre: Drama)
| Dick DeBartolo
| Mort Drucker
| 234
|1954-04 October 1982
|
| 
|-
| Conehead the Barbiturate| Conan the Barbarian (March 1982)(Genre: Sword & Sorcery)
| Dick DeBartolo
| Don Martin
| 235
|1954-04 December 1982
|
| 
|-
| Rockhead III| Rocky III (May 1982)(Genre: Sports drama)
| Arnie Kogen
| Jack Davis
| 235
|1954-04 December 1982
|
| 
|-
| Dumb Kind of Hero| Some Kind of Hero (April 1982)(Genre: Comedy-drama)
| Larry Siegel
| Mort Drucker
| 235
|1954-04 December 1982
|
| 
|-
| Awful Annie| Annie (June 1982)(Genre: Musical comedy-drama)
| Larry Siegel
| Angelo Torres
| 236
|1954-04 January 1983
|
| 
|-
| Q.T. the Quasi-Terrestrial| E.T. the Extra-Terrestrial (June 1982)(Genre: Science fiction comedy)
| Stan Hart
| Jack Davis
| 236
|1954-04 January 1983
|
| 
|-
| Star Blecch II: The Wreck of Korn| Star Trek II: The Wrath of Khan (June 1982)(Genre: Science fiction)
| Dick DeBartolo
| Mort Drucker
| 236
|1954-04 January 1983
|
| 
|-
| Paltry Guise| Poltergeist (June 1982)(Genre: Supernatural horror)
| Arnie Kogen
| Jack Davis
| 237
|1954-04 March 1983
|
| 
|-
| An Officer Ain't No Gentleman| An Officer and a Gentleman (July 1982)(Genre: Military drama) 
| Stan Hart
| Mort Drucker
| 238
|1954-04 April 1983
|
| 
|-
| The Verdiccch| The Verdict (December 1982)(Genre: Courtroom drama)
| Stan Hart
| Angelo Torres
| 239
|1954-04 June 1983
|
| 
|-
| Tootsie Role| Tootsie (December 1982)(Genre: Comedy-drama)
| Larry Siegel
| Mort Drucker
| 240
|1954-04 July 1983
|
| 
|-
| Star Bores: Re-hash of the Jeti| Return of the Jedi (May 1983)(Genre: Space opera)
| Dick DeBartolo
| Mort Drucker
| 242
|1954-04 October 1983
|
| 
|-
| Stuporman ZZZ| Superman III (June 1983)(Genre: Superhero film)
| Stan Hart
| Mort Drucker
| 243
|1954-04 December 1983
|
| 
|-
| Psycho, Too| Psycho II (June 1983)(Genre: Psychological horror)
| Dick DeBartolo
| Mort Drucker
| 244
|1954-04 January 1984
|
| 
|-
| Warped Games| WarGames (May 1983)(Genre: Science fiction)
| Larry Siegel
| Mort Drucker
| 244
|1954-04 January 1984
|
| 
|-
| Staying Awake| Staying Alive (July 1983)(Genre: Dance film)
| Stan Hart
| Jack Davis
| 245
|1954-04 March 1984
|
| 
|-
| Flashdunce| Flashdance (April 1983)(Genre: Romantic drama)
| Stan Hart
| Mort Drucker
| 246
|1954-04 April 1984
|
| 
|-
| Raunchy Business| Risky Business (August 1983)(Genre: Romantic comedy)
| Stan Hart
| Mort Drucker
| 246
|1954-04 April 1984
|
| 
|-
| Trading Races| Trading Places (June 1983)(Genre: Comedy)
| Stan Hart
| Mort Drucker
| 246
|1954-04 April 1984
|
| 
|-
| The Right Stiff| The Right Stuff (October 1983)(Genre: Space adventure)
| Dick DeBartolo
| Mort Drucker
| 247
|1954-04 June 1984
|
| 
|-
| Scarred Face| Scarface (December 1983)(Genre: Crime drama)
| Larry Siegel
| Jack Davis
| 248
|1954-04 July 1984
|
| 
|-
| Mentl| Yentl (November 1983)(Genre: Musical drama)
| Arnie Kogen
| Mort Drucker
| 248
|1954-04 July 1984
|
| 
|-
| Grimlins| Gremlins (June 1984)(Genre: Horror comedy)
| Stan Hart
| Mort Drucker
| 249
|1954-04 September 1984
|
| 
|-
| Inbanana Jones and the Temple of Goons| Indiana Jones and the Temple of Doom (May 1984)(Genre: Fantasy adventure)
| Dick DeBartolo
| Jack Davis
| 250
|1954-04 October 1984
|
| 
|-
| Splash-Dance| Splash (March 1984)(Genre: Fantasy comedy)
| Arnie Kogen
| Mort Drucker
| 250
|1954-04 October 1984
|
| 
|-
| Star Blecch III: The Search For Plot| Star Trek III: The Search for Spock (June 1984)(Genre: Science fiction)
| Arnie Kogen
| Mort Drucker
| 251
|1954-04 December 1984
|
| 
|-
| Ghost-Dusters| Ghostbusters (June 1984)(Genre: Supernatural comedy)
| Arnie Kogen
| Sam Viviano
| 253
|1954-04 March 1985
|
| 
|-
| The Karocky Kid| The Karate Kid (June 1984)(Genre: Martial arts drama)
| Arnie Kogen
| Harry North, Esq.
| 253
|1954-04 March 1985
|
| 
|-
| Purple Acid Rain| Purple Rain (July 1984)(Genre: Rock & Roll musical)
| Arnie Kogen
| Angelo Torres
| 253
|1954-04 March 1985
|
| 
|-
| Supergall| Supergirl (July 1984)(Genre: Superhero film)
| Dick DeBartolo
| Jack Davis
| 253
|1954-04 March 1985
|
| 
|-
| Gal of Me| All of Me (September 1984)(Genre: Fantasy comedy)
| Dick DeBartolo
| Mort Drucker
| 255
|1954-04 June 1985
|
| 
|-
| Beverly Hills Cop Out| Beverly Hills Cop (December 1984)(Genre: Action comedy)
| Dick DeBartolo
| Angelo Torres
| 256
|1954-04 July 1985
|
| 
|-
| Witless| Witness (February 1985)(Genre: Thriller)
| Stan Hart
| Angelo Torres
| 257
|1954-04 September 1985
|
| 
|-
| Getcha| Gotcha! (May 1985)(Genre: Action comedy)
| Arnie Kogen
| Mort Drucker
| 258
|1954-04 October 1985
|
| 
|-
| All the Right Movements| All the Right Moves (October 1983)(Genre: Sports drama)
| Arnie Kogen
| Mort Drucker
| 258
|1954-04 October 1985
|
| 
|-
| Classless| Class (July 1983)(Genre: Comedy-drama)
| Arnie Kogen
| Mort Drucker
| 258
|1954-04 October 1985
|
| 
|-
| Hot Dawg - The Movie| Hot Dog…The Movie (January 1984)(Genre: Teen sex comedy ski)
| Arnie Kogen
| Mort Drucker
| 258
|1954-04 October 1985
|
| 
|-
| The Breakfast Bunch| The Breakfast Club (February 1985)(Genre: Teen comedy-drama)
| Arnie Kogen
| Mort Drucker
| 258
|1954-04 October 1985
|
| 
|-
| Flashing Times at Ridgemont High| Fast Times at Ridgemont High (August 1982)(Genre: Teen coming-of-age comedy-drama)
| Arnie Kogen
| Mort Drucker
| 258
|1954-04 October 1985
|
| 
|-
| Caddyshlock| Caddyshack (July 1980)(Genre: Sports comedy)
| Arnie Kogen
| Mort Drucker
| 258
|1954-04 October 1985
|
| 
|-
| Cop Academy| Police Academy (March 1984)(Genre: Comedy)
| Arnie Kogen
| Mort Drucker
| 258
|1954-04 October 1985
|
| 
|-
| Revenge of the Nerdballs| Revenge of the Nerds (July 1984)(Genre: Comedy)
| Arnie Kogen
| Mort Drucker
| 258
|1954-04 October 1985
|
| 
|-
| Primate School| Private School (July 1983)(Genre: Teen sex comedy)
| Arnie Kogen
| Mort Drucker
| 258
|1954-04 October 1985
|
| 
|-
| Pokey's| Porky's (November 1981)(Genre: Teen sex comedy)
| Arnie Kogen
| Mort Drucker
| 258
|1954-04 October 1985
|
| 
|-
| Frisky Business| Risky Business (August 1983)(Genre: Teen coming-of-age comedy)
| Arnie Kogen
| Mort Drucker
| 258
|1954-04 October 1985
|
| 
|-
| Footloosed| Footloose (February 1984)(Genre: Musical drama)
| Arnie Kogen
| Mort Drucker
| 258
|1954-04 October 1985
|
| 
|-
| Zapping| Zapped! (July 1982)(Genre: Teen sex comedy)
| Arnie Kogen
| Mort Drucker
| 258
|1954-04 October 1985
|
| 
|-
| Pokey's Revenge| Porky's Revenge! (March 1985)(Genre: Sex comedy)
| Arnie Kogen
| Mort Drucker
| 258
|1954-04 October 1985
|
| 
|-
| Valley Chick| Valley Girl (April 1983)(Genre: Teen romantic comedy)
| Arnie Kogen
| Mort Drucker
| 258
|1954-04 October 1985
|
| 
|-
| Goofies| The Goonies (June 1985)(Genre: Adventure comedy)
| Stan Hart
| Jack Davis
| 258
|1954-04 October 1985
|
| 
|-
| Dumbo: More Blood Part II| Rambo: First Blood Part II (May 1985)(Genre: Action)
| Dick DeBartolo
| Mort Drucker
| 259
|1954-04 December 1985
|
| 
|-
| Bleak for the Future| Back to the Future (July 1985)(Genre: Science fiction comedy)
| Dick DeBartolo
| Mort Drucker
| 260
|1954-04 January 1986
|
| 
|-
| Kookoon| Cocoon (June 1985)(Genre: Science fiction fantasy)
| Arnie Kogen
| Mort Drucker
| 260
|1954-04 January 1986
|
| 
|-
| Rockhead IV| Rocky IV (November 1985)(Genre: Sports drama)
| Stan Hart
| Mort Drucker
| 262
|1954-04 April 1986
|
| 
|-
| The Fool of the Nile| The Jewel of the Nile (December 1985)(Genre: Action adventure)
| Dick DeBartolo
| Mort Drucker
| 263
|1954-04 June 1986
|
| 
|-
| Young Sureschlock Homely| Young Sherlock Holmes (December 1985)(Genre: Mystery adventure) 
| Dick DeBartolo
| Mort Drucker
| 263
|1954-04 June 1986
|
| 
|-
| Clown and Lout in Beverly Hills| Down and Out in Beverly Hills (January 1986)(Genre: Comedy)
| Stan Hart
| Mort Drucker
| 265
|1954-04 September 1986
|
| 
|-
| Henna and Her Sickos| Hannah and Her Sisters (February 1986)(Genre: Comedy-drama)
| Debbee Ovitz
| Mort Drucker
| 265
|1954-04 September 1986
|
| 
|-
| Top Gunk| Top Gun (May 1986)(Genre: Action-drama)
| Stan Hart
| Mort Drucker
| 267
|1954-04 December 1986
|
| 
|-
| Alienators| Aliens (July 1986)(Genre: Science fiction horror)
| Dick DeBartolo
| Jack Davis
| 268
|1954-04 January 1987
|
| 
|-
| Fearless Buller's Day Off| Ferris Bueller's Day Off (June 1986)(Genre: Teen comedy)
| Dennis Snee
| Angelo Torres
| 268
|1954-04 January 1987
|
| 
|-
| The Karocky Kid Part II| The Karate Kid Part II (June 1986)(Genre: Martial arts drama)
| Dick DeBartolo
| Angelo Torres
| 268
|1954-04 January 1987
|
| 
|-
| Stand But Me| Stand By Me (August 1986)(Genre: Comedy-drama)
| Dick DeBartolo
| Mort Drucker
| 269
|1954-04 March 1987
|
| 
|-
| The Color of Monotony| The Color of Money (October 1986)(Genre: Drama)
| Stan Hart
| Mort Drucker
| 270
|1954-04 April 1987
|
| 
|-
| Jumbled Joke Flash| Jumpin' Jack Flash (October 1986)(Genre: Spy comedy)
| Dick DeBartolo
| Mort Drucker
| 270
|1954-04 April 1987
|
| 
|-
| Peggy Got Stewed and Married| Peggy Sue Got Married (October 1986)(Genre: Comedy-drama)
| Stan Hart
| Mort Drucker
| 270
|1954-04 April 1987
|
| 
|-
| Star Blecch IV: The Voyage Bombs| Star Trek IV: The Voyage Home (November 1986)(Genre: Science fiction)
| Frank Jacobs
| Mort Drucker
| 271
|1954-04 June 1987
|
| 
|-
| Crock O'Dull Dummee| Crocodile Dundee (April 1986)(Genre: Adventure comedy)
| Dick DeBartolo
| Mort Drucker
| 273
|1954-04 September 1987
|
| 
|-
| Legal Wreckin
| Lethal Weapon (March 1987)(Genre: Action comedy)
| Dick DeBartolo
| Angelo Torres
| 274
|1954-04 October 1987
|
| 
|-
| Beverly Hills Slop, Too!
| Beverly Hills Cop II (May 1987)(Genre: Action comedy)
| Dick DeBartolo
| Mort Drucker
| 275
|1954-04 December 1987
|
| 
|-
| Predecessor
| Predator (June 1987)(Genre: Science fiction horror)
| Dick DeBartolo
| Jack Davis
| 276
|1954-04 January 1988
|
| 
|-
| The Unwatchables
| The Untouchables (June 1987)(Genre: Crime drama)
| Arnie Kogen
| Angelo Torres
| 276
|1954-04 January 1988
|
| 
|-
| The Wretches of Ecchflick
| The Witches of Eastwick (June 1987)(Genre: Fantasy comedy)
| Frank Jacobs
| Mort Drucker
| 276
|1954-04 January 1988
|
| 
|-
| Roboslop
| RoboCop (July 1987)(Genre: Science fiction)
| Dick DeBartolo
| Mort Drucker
| 277
|1954-04 March 1988
|
| 
|-
| Dorky Dancing
| Dirty Dancing (August 1987)(Genre: Romantic drama)
| Stan Hart
| Mort Drucker
| 278
|1954-04 April 1988
|
| 
|-
| Stinkout
| Stakeout (August 1987)(Genre: Crime comedy)
| Dick DeBartolo
| Angelo Torres
| 278
|1954-04 April 1988
|
| 
|-
| Feeble Attraction
| Fatal Attraction (September 1987)(Genre: Psychological thriller)
| Stan Hart
| Mort Drucker
| 279
|1954-04 June 1988
|
| 
|-
| Broadcast Snooze
| Broadcast News (December 1987)(Genre: Romantic comedy-drama)
| Stan Hart
| Angelo Torres
| 280
|1954-04 July 1988
|
| 
|-
| Three Morons and a Baby
| Three Men and a Baby (November 1987)(Genre: Comedy)
| Stan Hart
| Angelo Torres
| 280
|1954-04 July 1988
|
| 
|-
| Crock O'dull Dummee, Too
| Crocodile Dundee II (May 1988)(Genre: Adventure comedy)
| Dick DeBartolo
| Mort Drucker
| 283
|1954-04 December 1988
|
| 
|-
| Rambull III
| Rambo III (May 1988)(Genre: Action)
| Stan Hart
| Angelo Torres
| 283
|1954-04 December 1988
|
| 
|-
| Biggie
| Big (June 1988)(Genre: Fantasy comedy)
| Arnie Kogen
| Mort Drucker
| 284
|1954-04 January 1989
|
| 
|-
| Numbing to America
| Coming to America (June 1988)(Genre: Romantic comedy)
| Stan Hart
| Sam Viviano
| 284
|1954-04 January 1989
|
| 
|-
| Who De-Famed Robber Rabbit?
| Who Framed Roger Rabbit (June 1988)(Genre: Animated Fantasy comedy)
| Dick DeBartolo
| Angelo Torres
| 284
|1954-04 January 1989
|
| 
|-
| Crocktale
| Cocktail (July 1988)(Genre: Romantic drama)
| Dick DeBartolo
| Angelo Torres
| 285
|1954-04 March 1989
|
| 
|-
| Kookoon: The Rehash
| Cocoon: The Return (November 1988)(Genre: Science fiction fantasy)
| Dick DeBartolo
| Jack Davis
| 287
|1954-04 June 1989
|
| 
|-
| Twinge
| Twins (December 1988)(Genre: Comedy)
| Stan Hart
| Mort Drucker
| 288
|1954-04 July 1989
|
| 
|-
| Lurking Girl
| Working Girl (December 1988)(Genre: Romantic comedy-drama)
| Frank Jacobs
| Angelo Torres
| 288
|1954-04 July 1989
|
| 
|-
| Battyman
| Batman (June 1989)(Genre: Superhero film)
| Stan Hart
| Mort Drucker
| 289
|1954-04 September 1989
|
| 
|-
| Grossbusters II
| Ghostbusters II (June 1989)(Genre: Supernatural comedy)
| Stan Hart
| Mort Drucker
| 290
|1954-04 October 1989
|
| 
|-
| Inbanana Jones and His Last Crude Days
| Indiana Jones and the Last Crusade (May 1989)(Genre: Fantasy adventure)
| Dick DeBartolo
| Mort Drucker
| 291
|1954-04 December 1989
|
| 
|-
| No Hoax Barred
| No Holds Barred (June 1989)(Genre: Professional wrestling) 
| Stan Hart
| Jack Davis
| 291
|1954-04 December 1989
|
| 
|}

1990s
{| class="wikitable sortable"
! Spoofed Title
! Actual Title
! Writer
! Artist
! Issue
! Date
! Index
! Ref
|-
| Funny to Shrink the Kids
| Honey, I Shrunk the Kids (June 1989)(Genre: Comedy science fiction)
| Dick DeBartolo
| Mort Drucker
| 292
|1990-01 January 1990
|
| 
|-
| Legal Wreckin' Too!
| Lethal Weapon 2 (July 1989)(Genre: Buddy cop action comedy)
| Dick DeBartolo
| Jack Davis
| 293
|1990-04 March 1990
|
| 
|-
| Bleak for the Future Part II
| Back to the Future Part II (November 1989)(Genre: Science fiction-adventure comedy)
| Stan Hart
| Mort Drucker
| 295
|1990-06 June 1990
|
| 
|-
| Look Who's Squawking
| Look Who's Talking (October 1989)(Genre: Romantic comedy)
| Dick DeBartolo
| Angelo Torres
| 295
|1990-06 June 1990
|
| 
|-
| The Gore of the Roses
| The War of the Roses (December 1989)(Genre: Dark comedy)
| Dick DeBartolo
| Mort Drucker
| 296
|1990-07 July 1990
|
| 
|-
| The Hunt For Last October
| The Hunt For Red October (March 1990)(Genre: Espionage thriller)
| Stan Hart
| Angelo Torres
| 297
|1990-09 September 1990
|
| 
|-
| Grimlins PTU!: The New Botch
| Gremlins 2: The New Batch (June 1990)(Genre: Comedy horror)
| Stan Hart
| Mort Drucker
| 298
|1990-10 October 1990
|
| 
|-
| RoboCrap 2
| RoboCop 2 (June 1990)(Genre: Cyberpunk action-superhero)
| Stan Hart
| Angelo Torres
| 298
|1990-10 October 1990
|
| 
|-
| Teen Rage Moolah Nitwit Turtles
| Teenage Mutant Ninja Turtles (March 1990)(Genre: Superhero science fiction action comedy)
| Dick DeBartolo
| Sam Viviano
| 298
|1990-10 October 1990
|
| 
|-
| Totally Recalled
| Total Recall (June 1990)(Genre: Science-fiction action)
| Dick DeBartolo
| Mort Drucker
| 299
|1990-12 December 1990
|
| 
|-
| Casabonkers
| Casablanca (November 1942)(Genre: Romantic drama)
| Arnie Kogen
| Mort Drucker
| 300
|1991-01 January 1991
|
| 
|-
| Schtick Tracy
| Dick Tracy (June 1990)(Genre: Action comedy)
| Dick DeBartolo
| Angelo Torres
| 300
|1991-01 January 1991
|
| 
|-
| Groan with the Wind
| Gone with the Wind (December 1939)(Genre: Epic historical romance)
| Stan Hart
| Jack Davis
| 300
|1991-01 January 1991
|
| 
|-
| The Wizard of Odds
| The Wizard of Oz (August 1939)(Genre: Musical fantasy)
| Frank Jacobs
| Sam Viviano
| 300
|1991-01 January 1991
|
| 
|-
| Gauche
| Ghost (July 1990)(Genre: Romantic fantasy thriller)
| Stan Hart
| Angelo Torres
| 301
|1991-03 March 1991
|
| 
|-
| A Knack For Phobias
| Arachnophobia (July 1990)(Genre: Horror-comedy)
| Dick DeBartolo
| Paul Coker, Jr.
| 301
| 1991-03 March 1991
| 
|
|-
| Die Even Harder 2
| Die Hard 2 (July 1990)(Genre: Action)
| Stan Hart
| Mort Drucker
| 302
|1991-06 April 1991
|
|
|-
| Slutty Woman
| Pretty Woman (March 1990)(Genre: Romantic comedy)
| Stan Hart
| Mort Drucker
| 302
|1991-06 April 1991
|
|
|-
| Days of Blunder
| Days of Thunder (June 1990)(Genre: Sports action drama)
| Stan Hart
| Mort Drucker
| 302
|1991-06 April 1991
|
|
|-
| Flopliners
| Flatliners (July 1990)(Genre: Science fiction psychological horror)
| Stan Hart
| Mort Drucker
| 302
|1991-06 April 1991
|
|
|-
| Dorkman
| Darkman (August 1990)(Genre: Superhero)
| Stan Hart
| Mort Drucker
| 302
|1991-06 April 1991
|
|
|-
| Presumed Impotent
| Presumed Innocent (July 1990)(Genre: Legal drama)
| Stan Hart
| Mort Drucker
| 302
|1991-06 April 1991
|
|
|-
| Home A-groan
| Home Alone (November 1990)(Genre: Christmas comedy)
| Stan Hart
| Sam Viviano
| 303
|1991-06 June 1991
|
| 
|-
| Deadwood Scissorham
| Edward Scissorhands (December 1990)(Genre: Romantic dark fantasy)
| Arnie Kogen
| Mort Drucker
| 304
|1991-07 July 1991
|
| 
|-
| The Oddfather Part III
| The Godfather Part III (December 1990)(Genre: Crime)
| Dick DeBartolo
| Angelo Torres
| 304
|1991-07 July 1991
|
| 
|-
| Dunces with Wolves
| Dances with Wolves (October 1990)(Genre: Epic Western)
| Stan Hart
| Mort Drucker
| 305
|1991-09 September 1991
|
| 
|-
| The Violence of the Hams
| The Silence of the Lambs (February 1991)(Genre: Horror-thriller)
| Frank Jacobs
| Sam Viviano
| 305
|1991-09 September 1991
|
| 
|-
| Teen Rage Moolah Nitwit Turtles II
| Teenage Mutant Ninja Turtles II (March 1991)(Genre: Superhero science fiction action comedy)
| Dick DeBartolo
| Mort Drucker
| 306
|1991-10 October 1991
|
| 
|-
| Hackdraft
| Backdraft (May 1991)(Genre: Drama thriller)
| Dick DeBartolo
| Angelo Torres
| 307
|1991-12 December 1991
|
| 
|-
| Throbbin Hood, Prince of Heaves
| Robin Hood: Prince of Thieves (June 1991)(Genre: Romantic action adventure)
| Stan Hart
| Jack Davis
| 307
|1991-12 December 1991
|
| 
|-
| Interminable Too Misjudgment Day
| Terminator 2: Judgment Day (July 1991)(Genre: Science-fiction action)
| Dick DeBartolo
| Mort Drucker
| 308
|1992-01 January 1992
|
| 
|-
| The Adnauseam Family
| The Addams Family (November 1991)(Genre: Supernatural black comedy)
| Dick DeBartolo
| Mort Drucker
| 311
|1992-06 June 1992
|
| 
|-
| Buggy
| Bugsy (December 1991)(Genre: Crime-drama)
| Stan Hart
| Mort Drucker
| 312
|1992-07 July 1992
|
| 
|-
| Hook'em
| Hook (December 1991)(Genre: Fantasy adventure)
| Stan Hart
| Sam Viviano
| 312
|1992-07 July 1992
|
| 
|-
| Prince of Tirades
| The Prince of Tides (December 1991)(Genre: Romantic drama)
| Dick DeBartolo
| Angelo Torres
| 312
|1992-07 July 1992
|
| 
|-
| The Ham That Robs the Cradle
| The Hand that Rocks the Cradle (January 1992)(Genre: Psychological thriller)
| Dick DeBartolo
| Mort Drucker
| 313
|1992-09 September 1992
|
| 
|-
| Star Blecch V: The Farcical Frontier & Star Blecch VI: The Uninspired Continuation
| Star Trek V: The Final Frontier (June 1989) & Star Trek VI: The Undiscovered Country (December 1991)(Genre: Science fiction)
| Dick DeBartolo
| Paul Coker, Jr.
| Special #83
|1992-09 September 1992
|
| 
|-
| Basically It Stinks
| Basic Instinct (March 1992)(Genre: Neo-noir erotic thriller)
| Arnie Kogen
| Angelo Torres
| 314
|1992-10 October 1992
|
| 
|-
| Buttman Returns
| Batman Returns (June 1992)(Genre: Superhero)
| Stan Hart
| Mort Drucker
| 314
|1992-10 October 1992
|
| 
|-
| Lethal Wreckin' 3
| Lethal Weapon 3 (May 1992)(Genre: Buddy cop action comedy)
| Dick DeBartolo
| Mort Drucker
| 315
|1992-12 December 1992
|
| 
|-
| Patr*idiotic Games
| Patriot Games (June 1992)(Genre: Spy thriller)
| Dick DeBartolo
| Angelo Torres
| 316
|1993-01 January 1993
|
| 
|-
| Sister Axed
| Sister Act (May 1992)(Genre: Musical comedy)
| Stan Hart
| Mort Drucker
| 316
|1993-01 January 1993
|
| 
|-
| A League to Bemoan
| A League of Their Own (July 1992)(Genre: Sports comedy-drama)
| Stan Hart
| Angelo Torres
| 317
|1993-03 March 1993
|
| 
|-
| Home A-groan 2: Loot in New York
| Home Alone 2: Lost in New York (November 1992)(Genre: Christmas comedy)
| Dick DeBartolo
| Mort Drucker
| 318
|1993-04 April 1993
|
| 
|-
| Drek-ula
| Bram Stoker's Dracula (November 1992)(Genre: Gothic horror)
| Dick DeBartolo
| Mort Drucker
| 319
|1993-06 June 1993
|
| 
|-
| Blunder Siege
| Under Siege (October 1992)(Genre: Action-thriller)
| Stan Hart
| Angelo Torres
| 319
|1993-06 June 1993
|
| 
|-
| A-Lad-Dim
| Aladdin (November 1992)(Genre: Animated comedy musical romantic fantasy adventure)
| Stan Hart
| Angelo Torres
| 320
|1993-07 July 1993
|
| 
|-
| Beauty and the Beef
| Beauty and the Beast (November 1991)(Genre: Animated musical romantic fantasy)
| Stan Hart
| Angelo Torres
| 320
|1993-07 July 1993
|
| 
|-
| A Few Goofy Men
| A Few Good Men (December 1992)(Genre: Legal drama)
| Dick DeBartolo
| Mort Drucker
| 320
|1993-07 July 1993
|
| 
|-
| Groundhog Deja Vu
| Groundhog Day (February 1993)(Genre: Fantasy comedy)
| Stan Hart
| Angelo Torres
| 321
|1993-09 September 1993
|
| 
|-
| A Decent Disposal
| Indecent Proposal (April 1993)(Genre: Drama)
| Stan Hart
| Angelo Torres
| 322
|1993-10 October 1993
|
| 
|-
| Dive
| Dave (May 1993)(Genre: Comedy)
| Arnie Kogen
| Angelo Torres
| 323
|1993-12 December 1993
|
| 
|-
| Jurass-Has-Had-It Park
| Jurassic Park (June 1993)(Genre: Science-fiction adventure)
| Dick DeBartolo
| Mort Drucker
| 323
|1993-12 December 1993
|
| 
|-
| In Line to be Fired
| In the Line of Fire (July 1993)(Genre: Political thriller)
| Dick DeBartolo
| Angelo Torres
| 324
|1994-01 January 1994
|
| 
|-
| Senseless in Seattle
| Sleepless in Seattle (June 1993)(Genre: Romantic comedy-drama)
| Stan Hart
| Mort Drucker
| 324
|1994-01 January 1994
|
| 
|-
| The Stooge-itive
| The Fugitive (August 1993)(Genre: Thriller)
| Dick DeBartolo
| Angelo Torres
| 325
|1994-02 February 1994
|
| 
|-
| Mrs. Doubtful
| Mrs. Doubtfire (November 1993)(Genre: Comedy-drama)
| Stan Hart
| Angelo Torres
| 327
|1994-05 May 1994
|
| 
|-
| The Flickstones
| The Flintstones (May 1994)(Genre: Buddy comedy)
| Dick DeBartolo
| Angelo Torres
| 331
|1994-10 October–November 1994
|
| 
|-
| Mavershtick
| Maverick (May 1994)(Genre: Western comedy)
| Arnie Kogen
| Mort Drucker
| 331
|1994-10 October–November 1994
|
| 
|-
| Fairest Shlump
| Forrest Gump (July 1994)(Genre: Romantic drama)
| Arnie Kogen
| Mort Drucker
| 332
|1994-12 December 1994
|
| 
|-
| The Lion's Kin
| The Lion King (June 1994)(Genre: Animated epic musical)
| Stan Hart
| Sam Viviano
| 332
|1994-12 December 1994
|
| 
|-
| Not Quite Up to Speed
| Speed (June 1994)(Genre: Action thriller)
| Dick DeBartolo
| Angelo Torres
| 332
|1994-12 December 1994
|
| 
|-
| It's Clear the President is a Danger
| Clear and Present Danger (August 1994)(Genre: Spy thriller)
| Dick DeBartolo
| Angelo Torres
| 333
|1995-01 January–February 1995
|
| 
|-
| Untrue Spies
| True Lies (July 1994)(Genre: Action)
| Stan Hart
| Tom Bunk
| 333
|1995-01 January–February 1995
|
| 
|-
| Frankenslime
| Mary Shelley's Frankenstein (November 1994)(Genre: Horror drama)
| Dick DeBartolo
| Angelo Torres
| 334
|1995-03 March–April 1995
|
| 
|-
| Quease Show
| Quiz Show (September 1994)(Genre: Historical film)
| Stan Hart
| Mort Drucker
| 334
|1995-03 March–April 1995
|
| 
|-
| Intravenous with the Vampire
| Interview with the Vampire (November 1994)(Genre: Drama horror)
| Stan Hart
| Mort Drucker
| 335
|1995-05 May 1995
|
| 
|-
| Plot Friction
| Pulp Fiction (May 1994)(Genre: Crime black comedy)
| Arnie Kogen
| Sam Viviano
| 335
|1995-05 May 1995
|
| 
|-
| Buttman Fershlugginer
| Batman Forever (June 1995)(Genre: Superhero)
| Dick DeBartolo
| Mort Drucker
| 337
|1995-07 July 1995
|
| 
|-
| Judge Dreck
| Judge Dredd (June 1995)(Genre: Science fiction)
| Stan Hart
| Mort Drucker
| 338
|1995-08 August 1995
|
| 
|-
| Gasper
| Casper (May 1995)(Genre: Live-action/computer-animated fantasy comedy)
| Stan Hart
| Paul Coker Jr.
| 340
|1995-10 October–November 1995
|
| 
|-
| Die Hard with No Variance
| Die Hard with a Vengeance (May 1995)(Genre: Action)
| Dick DeBartolo
| Drew Friedman
| 340
|1995-10 October–November 1995
|
| 
|-
| Appalling 13
| Apollo 13 (June 1995)(Genre: Space docudrama)
| Stan Hart
| Angelo Torres
| 341
|1995-12 December 1995
|
| 
|-
| Hokeyhontas
| Pocahontas (June 1995)(Genre: Animated musical romantic drama)
| Dick DeBartolo
| Walt F. Rosenberg
| 341
|1995-12 December 1995
|
| 
|-
| Mr. Hollow's Old Puss
| Mr. Holland's Opus (December 1995)(Genre: Drama)
| Stan Hart
| Angelo Torres
| 346
|1996-06 June 1996
|
| 
|-
| Broke 'N' Narrow
| Broken Arrow (February 1996)(Genre: Action)
| Dick DeBartolo
| Mort Drucker
| 347
|1996-07 July 1996
|
| 
|-
| Wishin' for the Impossible
| Mission Impossible I (May 1996)(Genre: Action spy)
| Dick DeBartolo
| Angelo Torres
| 347
|1996-07 July 1996
|
| 
|-
| The Nerdcage
| The Birdcage (March 1996)(Genre: Comedy)
| Stan Hart
| Mort Drucker
| 348
|1996-08 August 1996
|
| 
|-
| Twit-sters
| Twister (May 1996)(Genre: Disaster adventure)
| Arnie Kogen
| Paul Coker Jr.
| 349
|1996-09 September 1996
|
| 
|-
| It's Depends Day
| Independence Day (July 1996)(Genre: Science fiction action)
| Dick DeBartolo
| Angelo Torres
| 350
|1996-10 October 1996
|
| 
|-
| It's a Blunderful Life
| It's a Wonderful Life (December 1946)(Genre: Christmas fantasy comedy-drama)
| Stan Hart
| Mort Drucker
| 350
|1996-10 October 1996
|
| 
|-
| Disgracer
| Eraser (June 1996)(Genre: Action thriller)
| Arnie Kogen
| Angelo Torres
| 351
|1996-11 November 1996
|
| 
|-
| The Hunchback and Note the Dame
| The Hunchback of Notre Dame (June 1996)(Genre: Animated musical drama)
| Dick DeBartolo
| Sam Viviano
| 351
|1996-11 November 1996
|
| 
|-
| The Crock
| The Rock (June 1996)(Genre: Action thriller)
| Stan Hart
| Mort Drucker
| 351
|1996-11 November 1996
|
| 
|-
| Star Blecch: Worst Contact
| Star Trek: First Contact (November 1996)(Genre: Science fiction)
| Dick DeBartolo
| Paul Coker Jr.
| 352
|1996-12 December 1996
|
| 
|-
| Marred Attack!
| Mars Attacks! (December 1996)(Genre: Comedy science fiction horror)
| Stan Hart
| Angelo Torres
| 353
|1997-01 January 1997
|
| 
|-
| Rancid
| Ransom (November 1996)(Genre: Crime thriller)
| Stan Hart
| Sam Viviano
| 354
|1997-02 February 1997
|
| 
|-
| The People vs. Larry Fylth
| The People vs. Larry Flynt (October 1996)(Genre: Biographical drama)
| Stan Hart
| Angelo Torres
| 357
|1997-05 May 1997
|
| 
|-
| Buttman & Rubbin'''
| Batman & Robin (June 1997)(Genre: Superhero)
| Arnie Kogen
| Mort Drucker
| 359
|1997-07 July 1997
|
| 
|-
| Howeird Stern, Private Putz| Howard Stern, Private Parts (February 1997)(Genre: Biographical comedy)
| Stan Hart
| Sam Viviano
| 359
|1997-07 July 1997
|
| 
|-
| Corn Air| Con Air (June 1997)(Genre: Action)
| Dick DeBartolo
| Angelo Torres
| 360
|1997-08 August 1997
|
| 
|-
| The Last Word on Jurass-Has-Had-It Park| The Lost World: Jurassic Park (May 1997)(Genre: Science-fiction adventure)
| Dick DeBartolo
| Paul Coker Jr.
| 361
|1997-09 September 1997
|
| 
|-
| Corntact| Contact (July 1997)(Genre: Science fiction drama)
| Dick DeBartolo
| Sam Viviano
| 363
|1997-11 November 1997
|
| 
|-
| F*!@/OFF| Face/Off (June 1997)(Genre: Science fiction action)
| Dick DeBartolo
| Mort Drucker
| 363
|1997-11 November 1997
|
| 
|-
| Air Farce One| Air Force One (July 1997)(Genre: Political action-thriller)
| Stan Hart
| Sam Viviano
| 364
|1997-12 December 1997
|
| 
|-
| G.I. Shame| G.I. Jane (August 1997)(Genre: Action)
| Josh Gordon
| Angelo Torres
| 365
|1998-01 January 1998
|
| 
|-
| Starless Troopers| Starship Troopers (November 1997)(Genre: Military science-fiction action)
| Dick DeBartolo
| Mort Drucker
| 367
|1998-03 March 1998
|
| 
|-
| Alien Resuscitated| Alien Resurrection (November 1997)(Genre: Science-fiction action horror)
| Dick DeBartolo
| Mort Drucker
| 368
|1998-04 April 1998
|
| 
|-
| Screech 2| Scream 2 (December 1997)(Genre: Slasher/Horror)
| Arnie Kogen
| Angelo Torres
| 368
|1998-04 April 1998
|
| 
|-
| Trypanic| Titanic (December 1997)(Genre: Epic romance-disaster)
| Dick DeBartolo
| Sam Viviano
| 369
|1998-05 May 1998
|
| 
|-
| Gotsilly| Godzilla (May 1998)(Genre: Monster film)
| Dick DeBartolo
| Angelo Torres
| 370
|1998-06 June 1998
|
| 
|-
| Sleep Impact| Deep Impact (May 1998)(Genre: Science-fiction disaster)
| Dick DeBartolo
| Mort Drucker
| 373
|1998-09 September 1998
|
| 
|-
| The Ecch-Files: Fight This Feature| The X-Files: Fight the Future (June 1998)(Genre: Science fiction thriller)
| Dick DeBartolo
| Timothy Shamey
| 374
|1998-09 September 1998
|
| 
|-
| The Truedumb Show| The Truman Show (June 1998)(Genre: Satirical science fiction)
| Stan Hart
| Sam Viviano
| 374
|1998-10 October 1998
|
| 
|-
| AHM-A-GETTIN' (The Hell Outta Here!)| Armageddon (July 1998)(Genre: Science fiction disaster)
| Arnie Kogen
| Angelo Torres
| 375
|1998-11 November 1998
|
| 
|-
| Hollow-Scream: It's 2 Slow| Halloween H2O (August 1998)(Genre: Slasher/Horror)
| Dick DeBartolo
| Sam Viviano
| 376
|1998-12 December 1998
|
| 
|-
| Whattabore| The Waterboy (November 1998)(Genre: Sports comedy)
| Dick DeBartolo
| Timothy Shamey
| 379
|1999-03 March 1999
|
| 
|-
| Flushmore| Rushmore (October 1998)(Genre: Comedy-drama)
| Stan Hart
| Angelo Torres
| 380
|1999-04 April 1999
|
| 
|-
| Star Blecch: Imperfection| Star Trek: Insurrection (December 1998)(Genre: Science fiction)
| Dick DeBartolo
| Mort Drucker
| 380
|1999-04 April 1999
|
| 
|-
| Playback| Payback (February 1999)(Genre: Neo-noir crime)
| Dick DeBartolo
| Angelo Torres
| 382
|1999-06 June 1999
|
| 
|-
| Satirize This| Analyze This (March 1999)(Genre: Gangster comedy)
| Josh Gordon
| Angelo Torres
| 383
|1999-07 July 1999
|
| 
|-
| Putz Adams| Patch Adams (December 1998)(Genre: Semi-biographical comedy-drama)
| Stan Hart
| Bill Wray
| 383
|1999-07 July 1999
|
| 
|-
| The Faketrix| The Matrix (April 1999)(Genre: Science fiction action)
| Dick DeBartolo
| Angelo Torres
| 384
|1999-08 August 1999
|
| 
|-
| Mild Mild Mess| Wild Wild West (June 1999)(Genre: Western action comedy)
| Dick DeBartolo
| Mort Drucker
| 384
|1999-08 August 1999
|
| 
|-
| Detroit Rock Sissies| Detroit Rock City (August 1999)(Genre: Comedy)
| Desmond Devlin
| Ray Alma
| 385
|1999-09 September 1999
|
| 
|-
| Star Bores Epic Load I: The Fandumb Megamess| Star Wars: Episode I – The Phantom Menace (May 1999)(Genre: Epic space opera)
| Dick DeBartolo
| Mort Drucker
| 385
|1999-09 September 1999
|
| 
|-
| Tarzany| Tarzan (June 1999)(Genre: Animated musical drama adventure)
| Dick DeBartolo
| Angelo Torres
| 386
|1999-10 October 1999
|
| 
|-
| I'm Enterin' Pie| American Pie (July 1999)(Genre: Teen sex comedy)
| Desmond Devlin
| Ray Alma
| 387
|1999-11 November 1999
|
| 
|-
| Big Bladder| Big Daddy (June 1999)(Genre: Comedy)
| Desmond Devlin
| Angelo Torres
| 387
|1999-11 November 1999
|
| 
|-
| The Bland Witch Project (Profits)| The Blair Witch Project (July 1999)(Genre: Supernatural horror)
| Desmond Devlin
| Bill Wray
| 387
|1999-11 November 1999
|
| 
|-
| Mouth Park: Piggish, Lamer & Uncouth| South Park: Bigger, Longer & Uncut (June 1999)(Genre: Adult animated musical comedy)
| Desmond Devlin
| Grey Blackwell
| 387
|1999-11 November 1999
|
| 
|}

2000s

2010s

2020s

2023 (Claptrap)

See also
 List of television show spoofs in Mad
 Mad (magazine)

Notes

 References 
Hendrix, Grady: "Cahiers du CinéMAD", Film Comment'', Film Society of the Lincoln Center, March/April 2013

External links
 The Mad Cover Site's list of film and television parodies

Film spoofs
Parodies of films